The FN FNX pistol is a series of semi-automatic, polymer-framed pistols manufactured in Columbia, South Carolina, by FN America (branded FNH USA), a division of Fabrique Nationale d'Herstal. The pistol is chambered for the 9×19mm Parabellum, .40 S&W, and .45 ACP cartridges. It was introduced in 2009 as the successor to the FN FNP.

Standard features
All variations of the pistols (save some law enforcement models that are decock only) include ambidextrous safety/decocking levers, magazine releases, and slide stop release levers.  All variations also include a Picatinny rail, tritium night sights, and a loaded chamber indicator on the right side.  New models are sold in a plastic hard case with three magazines, and two interchangeable backstraps.  As of 2012, new models include 4 interchangeable backstraps rather than two. One is shipped on the handgun and three extra are in the case. The backstraps are two different thicknesses and two different patterns (a cross-hatch pattern similar to the sides of the grip, and horizontal lines similar to the front of the grip).

Field stripping is accomplished by locking the slide to the rear, rotating the takedown lever clockwise ninety degrees and releasing the slide stop while carefully allowing the slide to be pushed forward out of the frame. The barrel and recoil spring then separate from the slide to complete the disassembly procedure.

Joint Combat Pistol Competition
The FNP-45 Tactical was developed to be entered into the Joint Combat Pistol from late 2005 to early 2006 for a new military sidearm to replace the M9 Pistol. The program was started in 2005 and run by USSOCOM which was a merger of two earlier programs, the army's Future Handgun System (FHS) and the Special Operations Forces Combat Pistol. The requirements for the JCP included being chambered for caliber .45 ACP, having an integrated Picatinny rail, including day/night sights, and being capable of accepting a suppressor. The FNP™-45 Tactical was offered with a 15-round magazine for the required .45 ACP caliber.

Variants
As of the beginning of October 2012, the only variants of the FNX 9 and FNX 40 pistol were purely cosmetic: both the FNX-9 and FNX-40 are available with the slide finished in matte black or stainless steel. The FNX 45 was released at the beginning of October 2012. It is currently available in Black, Stainless, and FDE (flat dark earth). The FNX 45 has magazines that come with 12 witness holes, numbering from 4 to 15, enabling the shooter to more accurately gauge the number of rounds left. This is in contrast to the original FNX having a hole marked 5, 10, and 14, for the FNX 40, or 5, 10, 15, 17 for the FNX 9.

The FNX Tactical was released in .45 ACP shortly after the initial production runs of the FNX 45. It features a threaded barrel, Suppressor height tritium night sights "rear yellow front green" and a milled slide to install optics like a micro red dot sight. Is available in FDE and black color options.

Function
The FNX is a short recoil operated pistol, much like many other centerfire pistols on the market. Its difference lies in the distance the barrel and the slide travel prior to the barrel dropping and unlocking. The FNX barrel and slide travel up to twice the distance of some other semiautomatic pistols before separating. This helps to reduce the felt recoil of the pistol by allowing the spring to absorb more momentum from both the barrel and the slide.

The pistol is hammer fired, as opposed to striker fired; this allows the pistol to be fired in either Single Action or Double Action mode. Its safety mechanism is based on the safety found on a M1911. It is possible to cock the hammer to the rear and engage the safety simultaneously to carry the weapon "cocked and locked". The safety lever acts as a decocker when pushed downward.

References

External links
 
 —FNH USA
 Owner's manual

FN Herstal firearms
9mm Parabellum semi-automatic pistols
.40 S&W semi-automatic pistols
.45 ACP semi-automatic pistols
Weapons and ammunition introduced in 2009
Semi-automatic pistols of the United States